Daniel Voigt (born 4 November 1977) is a retired Dutch football defender.

References

1977 births
Living people
Dutch footballers
PSV Eindhoven players
De Graafschap players
FC Den Bosch players
Helmond Sport players
Fortuna Sittard players
Wuppertaler SV players
1. FC Kleve players
JVC Cuijk players
Dutch expatriate footballers
Expatriate footballers in Germany
Dutch expatriate sportspeople in Germany
Eredivisie players
Eerste Divisie players
Association football defenders
Netherlands under-21 international footballers